The Molecular Frontiers Foundation (MFF) was founded under the auspices of the Nobel Foundation in 2007 by Bengt Nordén, a professor of physical chemistry at Chalmers University of Technology in Sweden and the former chair of the Nobel Committee for Chemistry. Part of the mission of MFF according to Nordén is to counter the "increasingly bad image that chemistry has in society" and the "decreasing interest in science by the young generation".

The MFF counts eleven Nobel Laureates amongst its 29-member Scientific Advisory Board.

It  holds a number of international symposium around the world. 
May 23,24, 2017 Stockholm, Sweden Title: Tailored Biology: Fundamental and Medicinal Insights co-chairs Bengt Nordén and Lorie Karnath 
May 9, 10, 2019 Stockholm, Sweden Title: Planet Earth; A Scientific Journey co-chairs Bengt Nordén and Lorie Karnath

Through its science-discussion website "MoleClues", the foundation awards the yearly "Molecular Frontiers Inquiry Prize" also known as the "kid Nobel" to equal numbers of girls and boys from around the world for asking the most penetrating scientific question. The entries are collected online and judged by the MFF Scientific Advisory Board during the annual Spring MFF Youth Forum in the Royal Swedish Academy of Sciences in Stockholm, Sweden.

References

External links 
 Official website of the MFF
 Molecular Frontiers Journal
 Bengt Nordén interviewed in Nature Chemical Biology 3, 79 (2007)
 List of MFF Scientific Advisory Board Members
 Science discussion website for children
 Molecular Frontiers Inquiry Prize
 Op Ed in New Scientist on the Molecular Frontiers Inquiry Prize, a "Nobel prize for children"

Chemistry organizations